Basildon and Billericay is a constituency in Essex represented in the House of Commons of the UK Parliament. Since its 2010 creation it has been represented by John Baron, a Conservative.

History
The seat was created for the 2010 general election following a review of the Parliamentary representation of Essex by the Boundary Commission for England.  It combined parts of the separate, now abolished, Basildon and Billericay constituencies.

The election has been won by the Conservative Party by large majorities.

Boundaries

The Borough of Basildon wards of Billericay East, Billericay West, Burstead, Crouch, Fryerns, Laindon Park, Lee Chapel North and St Martin's.

The seat merged about half of the previous constituency of Billericay with smaller parts of the former Basildon constituency – mostly around the centre of Basildon.

The Billericay constituency lost Wickford to the new Rayleigh and Wickford constituency, and Pitsea to the South Basildon and East Thurrock seat, which also included the remainder of the Basildon seat.

Members of Parliament
The current MP is the Conservative John Baron, who has held the seat since its creation.

Elections

Elections in the 2010s

* Served as an MP in the 2005–2010 Parliament

See also
South Basildon and East Thurrock constituency
 List of parliamentary constituencies in Essex

Notes

References

Constituencies of the Parliament of the United Kingdom established in 2010
Parliamentary constituencies in Essex
Politics of the Borough of Basildon
Billericay